The Eaton Hall Railway was an early  gauge minimum gauge estate railway built in 1896 at Eaton Hall in Cheshire. It was built for the Duke of Westminster  by Sir Arthur Percival Heywood, who had pioneered the use of  gauge with his Duffield Bank Railway at his house at Duffield, Derbyshire in 1874.

It had a branch to the estate brickworks at Cuckoo's Nest, Pulford. Other supplies were also transported to the main house and it sometimes carried passengers. The line closed in 1946 and was removed a year later. In 1994 a  garden railway was installed at Eaton Hall; it is open when the estate is open to the public.

Construction

The line was built on a surveyed course that followed the main driveway, across parkland, fields, and across two public highways. Across the Grosvenor estate, the railway was built to be as unobtrusive as possible by being laid level with the ground with a central drainage pipe beneath; however after leaving the park the line was embanked. Neither was the line fenced - where it crossed between fields it was carried on girders over a deep ditch to prevent cattle straying.

Pointwork was prepared at the workshop in Duffield (for which Heywood charged £7/15s/0d each), and carried to site.

Bridges over one or two streams, the longest being , but it crossed roadways on the level, at one point the main Wrexham to Chester road. Although Lord Heywood had obtained wayleave, it could only be a temporary arrangement because the Chester Corporation was not able to enter into a permanent agreement with a private railway. Heywood therefore campaigned for a clause in the proposed Light Railway Bill which would allow permission for public road crossings to be granted in perpetuity.

The railway opened in 1896. The  line included a branch to the brick store and estate workshop at Cuckoo's Nest at Pulford.

Rolling stock
Following this were two identical  locomotives, "Shelagh" and "Ursula". Further details are given below. Under test,  was achieved in safety.

All rolling stock was built to negotiate curves of 
minimum radius. Self-acting coupler-buffers were fitted and measures were taken to ensure interchangeability of parts.

The wagon 'tops' were removable to allow them to be used as flats, and bolster fittings were supplied to carry long items such as timber. An open 16 seat bogie coach, a bogie parcel van (for 'game') and a small open 4 wheeled brake 'van' were also provided at the opening. Other wagons were constructed by the Eaton Estate and rebuilt over the years.

Locomotives
 1896 Katie 
boiler 
grate area 
heating surface 
cylinders 
wheel diameter 
Brown/Heywood valve gear.
The original Katie was sold to the newly built Ravenglass and Eskdale Railway and then in 1922 to the Llewellyn Miniature Railway in Southport. In 1923 she was sold to the Fairbourne Miniature Railway where she operated trains until scrapping in 1926. In 2016 Katie was rebuilt, using its original frames. The engine has been on display at the Ravenglass and Eskdale Railway Museum, although it has occasionally been run, its first service was in 2018.

 1904 Shelagh 
boiler 
grate area 
heating surface 
cylinders 
wheel diameter 
Brown/Heywood valve gear.

 1916 Ursula 
as Shelagh

Operation
Freight would mainly be coal, timber, road metal and bricks. Heywood believed this to be  perfectly adequate for a  gauge of railway. One of Eaton Hall's fuel suppliers was the Chester fuel merchant Allan Morris & Co. It arranged for fuel supplies to be delivered in Standard-gauge waggons to Balderton sidings where the coal could be transferred into the line's narrow gauge trucks.

Closure
Eaton Hall railway closed in 1946 and was lifted in 1947. Sections of it were transported to the Romney, Hythe and Dymchurch Railway.

Garden railway
A new  railway, named the Eaton Park Railway was opened in 1994. Trains on the line are hauled by a 'replica Katie. It is not available for use by the public except on the various garden open days. The new line consists of a large loop with a spur leading to the engine shed. The latter section of track follows a small part of the original route.

See also
 Fifteen-inch gauge railway

References
 Clayton, H. (1968) The Duffield Bank and Eaton Railways, The Oakwood Press, X19, 
 Heywood, A.P. (1898) Minimum Gauge Railways, 3rd Ed., Derby: Bemrose. Republished (1974) by Turntable Enterprises, 
 Smithers, Mark (1995) Sir Arthur Heywood and the Fifteen Inch (381 mm)  Gauge Railway, Plateway Press, .

Specific

External links

Sir Arthur Heywood
15 in gauge railways in England